Garden Plain is a city in Sedgwick County, Kansas, United States.  As of the 2020 census, the population of the city was 948.

History 
Garden Plain had its start by the building of the Wichita and Western Railroad from Wichita to Kingman. Garden Plain was incorporated in 1902.

Geography
Garden Plain is located at  (37.660451, -97.681811).

Demographics

2015 census
As of the census of 2015, there were 879 people. The racial makeup of the city was 97.6% White, 0.1% African American, 0.3% Native American, 0.0% Asian, 0.2% from other races, and 0.0% from two or more races. Hispanic or Latino of any race were 1.7% of the population.

2010 census
As of the census of 2010, there were 849 people, 308 households, and 221 families residing in the city. The racial makeup of the city was 97.8% White, 0.4% African American, 0.2% Native American, 0.1% Asian, 0.2% from other races, and 1.3% from two or more races. Hispanic or Latino of any race were 0.6% of the population.

There were 308 households, of which 43.2% had children under the age of 18 living with them, 58.4% were married couples living together, 8.8% had a female householder with no husband present, 4.5% had a male householder with no wife present, and 28.2% were non-families. 26.9% of all households were made up of individuals, and 15.3% had someone living alone who was 65 years of age or older. The average household size was 2.76 and the average family size was 3.40.

The median age in the city was 34.5 years. 33.1% of residents were under the age of 18; 6.8% were between the ages of 18 and 24; 24.9% were from 25 to 44; 22.5% were from 45 to 64; and 12.7% were 65 years of age or older. The gender makeup of the city was 49.7% male and 50.3% female.

2000 census
As of the census of 2000, there were 797 people, 286 households, and 201 families residing in the city. The racial makeup of the city was 97.37% White, 0.38% African American, 0.63% Native American, 0.13% Asian, 0.63% from other races, and 0.88% from two or more races. Hispanic or Latino of any race were 1.38% of the population.

There were 286 households, out of which 39.9% had children under the age of 18 living with them, 60.8% were married couples living together, 7.7% had a female householder with no husband present, and 29.4% were non-families. 27.3% of all households were made up of individuals, and 15.4% had someone living alone who was 65 years of age or older. The average household size was 2.79 and the average family size was 3.47.

In the city, the population was spread out, with 34.5% under the age of 18, 5.5% from 18 to 24, 26.9% from 25 to 44, 19.1% from 45 to 64, and 14.1% who were 65 years of age or older. The median age was 34 years. For every 100 females, there were 102.8 males. For every 100 females age 18 and over, there were 97.7 males.

As of 2000 the median income for a household in the city was $48,068, and the median income for a family was $56,375. Males had a median income of $40,750 versus $25,577 for females. The per capita income for the city was $22,946. About 2.8% of families and 4.0% of the population were below the poverty line, including 3.0% of those under age 18 and 6.7% of those age 65 or over.

Education
The community is served by Renwick USD 267 public school district.

The Garden Plain Owls have won the following Kansas State High School championships:
 1973 Boys Basketball - Class 1A 
 1978 Girls Basketball - Class 2A 
 1980 Boys Basketball - Class 2A 
 1989 Boys Basketball - Class 2A 
 1995 Girls Basketball - Class 2A 
 1999 Boys Basketball - Class 2A 
 2001 Girls Basketball - Class 2A 
 2007 Football - Class 3A

Transportation
U.S. Routes 54 / 400 is located a few blocks north of the city running east/west. Many streets in the area are of dirt gravel.

The K&O Railroad line connects to the city from the west.  The line east of the city is abandoned.

Notable people
Notable individuals who were born in and/or have lived in Garden Plain include:
 James Bausch (1906-1974), Decathlon gold medalist at 1932 Summer Olympics
 Dan Kerschen (1952- ), Kansas state legislator

See also
 Lake Afton

References

Further reading

External links

 City of Garden Plain
 Garden Plain - Directory of Public Officials
 Garden Plain city map, KDOT

Cities in Kansas
Cities in Sedgwick County, Kansas
Wichita, KS Metropolitan Statistical Area
Populated places established in 1884
1884 establishments in Kansas